Valamitiyawa is a small town in Southern Province, Sri Lanka, Sri Lanka.

See also
List of towns in Southern Province, Sri Lanka

Populated places in Southern Province, Sri Lanka